Peeter Karu (21 September 1909 – 14 April 1942) was an Estonian sport shooter.
He was born in Võisiku Rural Municipality, Viljandi County.

He began his shooting career in 1937. He won three medals at 1939 ISSF World Shooting Championships. In 1939 he become Estonian champion. In 1939 he was a member of the Estonian national sport shooting team.

References

1909 births
1942 deaths
Estonian male sport shooters
People from Põltsamaa Parish
20th-century Estonian people